Oreovac may refer to:

 Oreovac (Niš), a village in Serbia
 Oreovac (Bela Palanka), a village in Serbia